Chief Secretaries of Rajasthan
The list of Chief Secretaries of Rajasthan with tenure.

Chief Secretary

References

External links 
 
 
 

Government of Rajasthan
Lists of Indian civil servants
People from Rajasthan
Chief Secretaries